Afraid of Love is a 1925 British silent drama film directed by Reginald West and starring Leslie Faber, Jameson Thomas and Moore Marriott.

A review in The Kinematograph Weekly in 1925 says that the plot involves a married man seducing a working-class young woman. At the end of the film the married man commits suicide, his wife marries an old friend and the young woman goes back to her mother. The reviewer writes that the acting is good, the direction "intensely theatrical" and that "The curiosity value of this picture is obvious and exceptional, and it can be played to good business almost anywhere".

Cast
 Leslie Faber as Anthony Bond 
 Jameson Thomas as Philip Bryce 
 Moore Marriott as Father 
 Adeline Hayden Coffin as Mother 
 Mickey Brantford as Tony Bond 
 Juliette Compton as Ruth

References

External links
 

1925 films
British drama films
1920s English-language films
British black-and-white films
British silent feature films
1925 drama films
1920s British films
Silent drama films